M1910 may refer to:

 FN Browning M1910 pistol
 PM M1910, Russian machine gun
 122 mm howitzer M1910/30, Russian artillery piece
 152 mm howitzer M1910, Russian artillery piece
 152 mm howitzer M1910/37, Russian artillery piece
 152 mm siege gun M1910, Russian artillery piece
 152 mm gun M1910/34, Russian artillery piece
 152 mm gun M1910/30, Russian artillery piece
 107 mm gun M1910, Russian artillery piece
 107 mm gun M1910/30, Russian artillery piece
 14-inch gun M1910, US Army artillery piece

See also
M10 (disambiguation)